The United Nations Public Service Day is celebrated on June 23 of every year.  The UN Public Service Day was designated by the United Nations General Assembly's resolution A/RES/57/277 of 2003, to “celebrate the value and virtue of public service to the community”.  The United Nations Economic and Social Council established that the United Nations Public Service Awards be bestowed on Public Service Day for contributions made to the cause of enhancing the role, prestige, and visibility of public service.

The day also marks the anniversary of the date when the International Labour Organization adopted the Convention on Labour Relations (Public Service), 1978 (No. 151).  This convention is a framework for determining working conditions of all civil servants across the world.

External links
United Nations Public Service Day

United Nations days
June observances